Walter Rilla (22 August 1894 – 21 November 1980) was a German film actor of Jewish descent. He appeared in more than 130 films between 1922 and 1977. He was born in Neunkirchen, Germany and died in Rosenheim, Germany.

Career
Having debuted on the stage, Rilla began his film in career in Germany during the silent era. This included an early role for him in Friedrich Wilhelm Murnau's The Grand Duke's Finances in 1924. Following the rise of the Nazi Party to power in 1933, he emigrated to Britain and became a regular performer in British films often in villainous or aristocratic roles. Both during and after the Second World War he played Nazi officers or agents.

From the 1950s onwards he returned to West Germany to appear in films and on television, alternating this with continued roles in British cinema. He was the father of film director Wolf Rilla, who directed him in the 1963 film Cairo.

Filmography

 Hannele's Journey to Heaven (1922) .... Todesengel
 The Fall of Jerusalem (1922) .... Amosa, Captain of the Guard
 All for Money (1923) .... Henry von Lauffen
 The Beautiful Girl (1923) .... Franz, Sohn der Götts
 The Grand Duke's Finances (1924) .... Luis Hernandez
 In the Name of the King (1924)
 Leap Into Life (1924) .... Frank - Ideas Partner
 The Monk from Santarem (1924)
 The Blackguard (1925) .... Michael Caviol
 The Doll of Luna Park (1925)
 Fire of Love (1925) .... Harald von Bodenstein
 The Ones Down There (1926) .... Andre
 Cab No. 13 (1926) .... Lucien Rebout
 The Fiddler of Florence (1926) .... Maler
 Should We Be Silent? (1926) .... Dr. Georg Mauthner
 Maytime (1926) .... Fred W. Kietz
 Her Highness Dances the Waltz (1926)
 The Divorcée (1926) .... Karel van Lysseweghe, Staatssekretär
 The World Wants To Be Deceived (1926) .... Dr. Stone, Arzt
 The Queen of the Baths (1926) .... Lord Arthur Blythe
 Wie bleibe ich jung und schön - Ehegeheimnisse (1926)
 The Sporck Battalion (1927) .... Leutnant von Naugard
 Children's Souls Accuse You (1927)
 Poor Little Colombine (1927) .... Ernst Honsel
 The White Spider (1927) .... Lord Barrymore
 That Dangerous Age (1927) .... Jörgen - Student
 Orient Express (1927) .... Allan Wilton
 Doña Juana (1928) .... Don Ramon
 Sajenko the Soviet (1928) .... Mirow, Sekretär des Handelsbüros
 The Schorrsiegel Affair (1928) .... Bernhard Benda
 Eva in Silk (1928) .... Dr. Erich Stiereß, Schriftsteller
 Princess Olala (1928) .... Prince Boris, the Prince's Son
 The Last Night (1928) .... Ernest
 Honour Thy Mother (1928) .... Fritz - ihr Sohn
 The Abduction of the Sabine Women (1928) .... Emil Groß, genannt Sterneck, sein Sohn
 The Man with the Frog (1929) .... Henri Vallencours
 Inherited Passions (1929) .... Henry Bourtyne
 The Monte Cristo of Prague (1929) .... Fred Born
 Gentlemen Among Themselves (1929) .... Heinz Rüdiger, Student der Medizin
 Incest (1929) .... Martin Hollman
 Sin of a Beautiful Woman (1929) .... Richard Kent
 Marriage in Trouble (1929) .... Mann
 Karriere (1930)
 It Happens Every Day (1930)
 Rendezvous (1930) .... Armand
 The Great Longing (1930) .... Himself
 Marriage in Name Only (1930) .... Baron Hans v. Velten
 Different Morals (1931) .... Norman
 Circus Life (1931) .... Morini. Kunstschütze
 Checkmate (1931) .... Georg Holl, Journalist
 Reckless Youth (1931) .... Dan O'Bannon, Prosecutor
 24 Hours in the Life of a Woman (1931) .... Sascha Lonay
 The Men Around Lucy (1931) .... Robert
 Hände aus dem Dunkel (1933) .... Direktor Leermann
 A Certain Mr. Gran (1933) .... Pietro Broccardo, Maler
 Un certain monsieur Grant (1933) .... Mario Landi
 Adventures on the Lido (1933) .... Leonard
 The Hunter from Kurpfalz (1933) .... Baron Hans, sein Bruder, Buchhändler
 The Champion of Pontresina (1934) .... Peter Tonani, Geigenvirtuose
 The Scarlet Pimpernel (1934) .... Armand St. Just
 Abdul the Damned (1935) .... Hassan-Bey
 Lady Windermere's Fan (1935) .... Lord Windermere
 Love's Awakening (1936) .... Robert Lund - Violinvirtuose
 The Accusing Song (1936) .... Detlef Ollmer - Bildhauer
 Victoria the Great (1937) .... Prince Ernest
 Mollenard (1938) .... Frazer
 Sixty Glorious Years (1938) .... Prince Ernst
 The Gang's All Here (1939) .... Prince Homouska
 Black Eyes (1939) .... Roudine
 Hell's Cargo (1939) .... Cmndt. Lestailleur
 At the Villa Rose (1940) .... Mr. Ricardo
 The Adventures of Tartu (1943) .... Inspector Otto Vogel
 Candlelight in Algeria (1944) .... Dr. Muller
 Mr. Emmanuel (1944) .... Brockenburg
 Lisbon Story (1946) .... Karl von Schriner
 It's Hard to Be Good (1948) .... Kamerovsky (uncredited)
 Golden Salamander (1950) .... Serafis
 State Secret (1950) .... General Niva
 My Daughter Joy (1950) .... Andreas
 Shadow of the Eagle (1950) .... Prince Radziwill
 I'll Get You for This (1951) .... Mueller
 Without a Flag (1951) .... Spionagechef
 Venetian Bird (1952) .... Count Boria
 Desperate Moment (1953) .... Col. Bertrand, Dutch consulate
 Star of India (1954) .... Van Horst
 The Green Carnation (1954) .... Frank Olsen
 Track the Man Down (1955) .... Austin Melford
 The Gamma People (1956) .... Boronski
 Confessions of Felix Krull (1957) .... Lord Kilmarnock
 Scampolo (1958) .... Lombardo
  (1958) .... Michael Fabian
 For the First Time (1959) .... Dr. Bessart
 Love Now, Pay Later (1959) .... Alexander Woltikoff, Geschäftsmann
 Beloved Augustin (1960) .... Baron von Gravenreuth
 Song Without End (1960) .... Archbishop
 The Secret Ways (1961) .... Jancsi
 Our House in Cameroon (1961) .... John Leith
 Riviera-Story (1961) .... Nikanos
 The Forger of London (1961) .... Konsul Steensand
 The Wonderful World of the Brothers Grimm (1962) .... Priest
 Das Testament des Dr. Mabuse (1962) .... Prof. Pohland
 Cairo (1963) .... Kuchuk
 Scotland Yard Hunts Dr. Mabuse (1963) .... Dr. Pohland / 'Dr. Mabuse'
  (1963, TV film) .... Juror 9
 Death Drums Along the River (1963) .... Dr. Schneider
 Room 13 (1964) .... Sir Marney
 The Secret of Dr. Mabuse (1964) .... Prof. Pohland
 The River Line (1964) .... Pierre, Maries Vater
 Victim Five (1964) .... Wexler
 The Seventh Victim (1964) .... Lord John Mant
 Frozen Alive (1964) .... Sir Keith
 The Face of Fu Manchu (1965) .... Muller
 4 Schlüssel (1966) .... Bankdirektor Rose
 Die Rechnung – eiskalt serviert (1966) .... John M. Clark
 Once a Greek (1966) .... Staatspräsident
 Martin Soldat (1966) .... Général von Haffelrats
 Day of Anger (1967) .... Murph Allan Scott
 The Girl from Rio (1969) .... Ennio Rossini (uncredited)
 Detectives (1969) .... Krüger
 Pepe, der Paukerschreck (1969) .... Ministerialdirektor
 The Devil Came from Akasava (1971) .... Lord Kingsley
 Malpertuis (1971) .... Eisengott
  (1977)

References

Bibliography
 Prawer, S.S. Between Two Worlds: The Jewish Presence in German and Austrian Film, 1910-1933. Berghahn Books, 2007.
 Dove, Richard. Journey of No Return: Five German-speaking Literary Exiles in Britain, 1933-1945. Libris, 2000.

External links

Photographs and literature

1894 births
1980 deaths
Jewish German male actors
German male film actors
German male silent film actors
People from Neunkirchen District, Austria
20th-century German male actors
German emigrants to the United Kingdom
People who emigrated to escape Nazism